Arcicella is a genus of aerobic bacteria  from the family of Spirosomaceae.

References

Further reading 
 
 
 
 
 
 

Cytophagia
Bacteria genera